John Robert Leslie, MP (3 November 1873  – 12 January 1955) was a Labour Party politician in the United Kingdom.

He was born in Lerwick, Shetland, Scotland to John Leslie and Clementina Hunter. Leslie and his wife had 3 sons, John, William and Robert, and two daughters, Clementina and Alice.  He moved to London from Edinburgh, where his first son was born, in 1912.

He was elected as Member of Parliament (MP) for Sedgefield in County Durham at the 1935 general election, defeating the Conservative Party MP Roland Jennings, who had been elected in 1931. When discussing the 1938 Hire Purchase Act, Leslie made anti-Semitic accusations over the apparent involvement of Jewish people in extortionate hire-purchase agreements: ‘I do not want to raise racial prejudices, but hon. Members can guess his nationality'. John Leslie held the seat until he retired from the House of Commons at the 1950 general election.

References
Leslie: Births & baptisms - Caithness, Orkney & Shetland

Specific

External links 
 

1873 births
1955 deaths
General Secretaries of the National Amalgamated Union of Shop Assistants, Warehousemen and Clerks
Labour Party (UK) MPs for English constituencies
Members of the General Council of the Trades Union Congress
National Amalgamated Union of Shop Assistants, Warehousemen and Clerks-sponsored MPs
UK MPs 1935–1945
UK MPs 1945–1950